The 'Ataúlfo' mango is a mango cultivar from Mexico. The flesh is not fibrous, and the pit is thin. They were named for grower Ataulfo Morales Gordillo. Since August 27, 2003, the Ataulfo mango is one of the 18 Mexican Designations of Origin.

Origin 
The Mexican Institute of Industrial Property (Instituto Mexicano de la Propiedad Industrial) granted the designation of origin of this fruit to the government of Chiapas. Along with the Manilita mango, it is a descendant of the Philippine mango cultivar introduced from the Philippines to Mexico before 1779 through the Manila-Acapulco galleon trade. It was crossed with other mango varieties, resulting in the Ataulfo. Regardless, Ataulfo remains a Philippine-type mango, characterized by being polyembryonic (as opposed to the Indian-type which is monoembryonic).

In 1958, the agronomist Hector Cano Flores (the discoverer of Ataulfo mango) reportedly made a clone of an Ataulfo mango which he named IMC-M2.

In 2003, the Mexican government, through the Official Gazette, published Comunicado No. 14 – 2003 titled "Abstract of the application for the declaration (protection) of the Appellation of Origin: Mango Ataulfo del Soconusco Chiapas", a declaration that the term "Mango Ataulfo del Soconusco Chiapas" is an appellation of origin for a specific kind of mango fruit produced in several regions of Chiapas, Mexico where the Ataulfo was first grown by Ataulfo Morales Gordillo.

Production 
The fruit grows in warm, moist climates with summer rains, but monsoon temperatures must not decline to 5 °C. The proper temperature for this type of mango is 28 °C with rainfall between 1090–3000 mm annually, from April to October.

The Ataulfo mangoes originate in the Mexican states of Michoacan, Sinaloa, Nayarit, Jalisco, Veracruz and Chiapas, and are sold between March and September. In the Mexican state of Chiapas, mango production was, as of 2008, the sixth most important agricultural activity, based on cultivated surfaces, following corn, beans, coffee, sugar cane and cocoa. Ataulfo production in that state was concentrated in the Soconusco coastal region. Overall, producer organizations estimated that there were 18,000 hectares of Ataulfo mangoes in production in the state. 

There are several pests that influence the growth and production of the mangos including fruit flies and mango seed weevil.

Consumption 
Ataulfo mangoes gained popularity in the United States beginning in the late 1990s, though they have been a major crop in Mexico for decades. As of 2009, they were the second-most popular variety of mango sold in the U.S., behind the Tommy Atkins. As of 2018, they represented a little less than 20% of all mangoes imported into the U.S.

Until 2014, Mexican ataulfo mangoes had not been sold in significant numbers in Europe because shipping them by air was prohibitively expensive. In December 2014, shipments by sea began via one United Kingdom importer using timed pre-ripe harvesting combined with faster sea-shipping that enabled full mango ripening while in transit. European customers are willing to pay significantly more than North American customers, if the mangos are of high quality and are sold ready-to-eat.

References

Mango cultivars
Mexican Designation of Origin